was an Ainu rebellion against Japanese authority on Hokkaidō between 1669 and 1672. It was led by Ainu chieftain Shakushain against the Matsumae clan, who represented Japanese trading and governmental interests in the area of Hokkaidō then controlled by the Japanese (Yamato people).

The war began as a fight for resources between Shakushain's people and a rival Ainu clan in the Shibuchari River (Shizunai River) basin of what is now Shinhidaka, Hokkaidō. The war developed into a last try by the Ainu to keep their political independence and regain control over the terms of their trade relations with the Yamato people.

According to scholar Brett Walker:
Shakushain's War stands out as a watershed event in the history of the conquest of Ezo. Shakushain exploded onto the scene as a charismatic leader who proved able to bridge regional differences among Ainu communities, threatening to unite them against the Japanese intrusion from the south. The Tokugawa shogunate reacted by solidifying its own united front of military allies in the northeast, replacing local Matsumae generals with men of its own choosing, thus illustrating its self-appointed role as defender of the realm.

At the end of 1669, Shakushain's forces surrendered to the Matsumae. The two sides exchanged gifts and negotiated a peace settlement; however, while Ainu generals celebrated with "liberal helpings of saké", they were assassinated by Matsumae warriors. Shakushain was among those killed that day.

The only other comparable large-scale revolt by Ainu against Japanese rule was the Menashi-Kunashir Battle of 1789. An earlier rebellion along the same lines was Koshamain's Revolt in 1456.

References

Brett L. Walker, The Conquest of Ainu Lands: Ecology and Culture in Japanese Expansion 1590–1800. University of California Press, 2001, pages 49–56, 61–71.

External links

History of Hokkaido
Ainu history
Rebellions in Japan
Conflicts in 1669
Conflicts in 1670
Conflicts in 1671
Conflicts in 1672
17th-century rebellions
1669 in Japan
1670 in Japan
1671 in Japan
1672 in Japan
17th-century military history of Japan
Asian resistance to colonialism
Genocides in Asia